Viktor Mikhailovich Shustikov (born January 28, 1939) is a former Soviet Russian footballer. He is the father of Sergei Shustikov and the grandfather of Sergei Shustikov Jr.

Honours
 Soviet Top League winner: 1960, 1965.
 Soviet Top League runner-up: 1961, 1964.
 Soviet Top League bronze: 1968.
 Soviet Cup winner: 1960, 1968, 1972.
 Top 33 players year-end list: 1959, 1960, 1961, 1963, 1964, 1965.

International career
He earned 8 caps for the USSR national football team, and participated in the 1964 European Nations' Cup, where the Soviets were the runners-up.

External links
Profile (in Russian)

1939 births
Living people
Russian footballers
Soviet footballers
Soviet Union international footballers
1964 European Nations' Cup players
Soviet Top League players
FC Torpedo Moscow players
FC Volgar Astrakhan managers
Association football defenders
Russian football managers